Rodolfo Marán (born 24 May 1897, date of death unknown) was a Uruguayan footballer. He played in eight matches for the Uruguay national football team from 1916 to 1923. He was also part of Uruguay's squad for the 1916 South American Championship.

References

External links
 

1897 births
Year of death missing
Uruguayan footballers
Uruguay international footballers
Place of birth missing
Association football forwards
Club Nacional de Football players